Karl Blau is an American indie rock and country vocalist, producer, songwriter, and multi-instrumentalist based in Philadelphia, Pennsylvania, but originally from Anacortes, Washington. A member of the Knw-Yr-Own/K Records collective, he is known for his musical output, live shows, and self recording and distribution. Blau incorporates elements of folk, dub, R&B, bossa nova, grunge, hip hop, drone, country, & worldbeat.

Career 
Blau has released more than 40 records in 20-odd years, many self-released in handmade packaging and mailed to subscribers as part of his Kelp Lunacy Advanced Plagiarism series, and others on iconic indie Northwest labels K Records and knw-yr-own. Blau has also toured and recorded for years with Laura Veirs, the Microphones/Mount Eerie, Little Wings, D+, Your Heart Breaks, LAKE, and Earth.

In the 1990s, Blau worked at The Business record store in Anacortes.

Blau was referenced in a song carrying his name by the London punk band Video Nasties. The Microphones' album, It Was Hot, We Stayed in the Water, also has a song titled "Karl Blau."

Discography

LPs 
Doin' Things the Way They Happen (Knw-Yr-Own 1997)
Shell Collection (Knw-Yr-Own 1997)
A Second Culling (Knw-Yr-Own 1999)
Clothes Your I's (Knw-Yr-Own 2001)
Beneath Waves (K Records 2006)
Dance positive (Marriage Records 2007)
Nature's Got Away (K Records 2008)
Zebra (K Records 2009)
Introducing Karl Blau (Raven Marching Band/Bella Union 2016)
Out Her Space (Bella Union 2017)
Scream Time (Self-Released 2022)

Singles 
"Slow Down Joe" b/w "Lake King's Daughter" (K Records/OnPurpose Records 2006)
"That's How I Got To Memphis" b/w "Forest" (collaboration with Mount Analog) (K Records)

Kelp Lunacy Advanced Plagiarism Society series
Dark, Magic Sea
The Coconutcracker
Turning Tutu, Turning Leaves
Dunkel Blau
Purple Heart
Deep Sandwich
Remember Tomorrow
Lore of Ears
Dubble Dooty Booty
Trust in Sirens
It Was Hot, We Stayed in the Water
Welsh Phantoms and Other Ghosts of Western Europe
Sea/Saw
Stereoearrings
If I Knew Zen What I Know Now
AM
Sing Together/Lonely Under the Covers
Beer & Chai
Flotsam & Jetsam
Let It All Out
Sigh Lens
Bread-n-Grease
Trunkal Howl
LAKE
Free The Bird
Dance Positive
Good Lovin' County
In Return From Ghost Country

References

External links 
 Karl Blau at Bandcamp
Karl Blau Patreon
Karl Blau at Allmusic.com
Karl Blau at K Records
Karl Blau at Bella Union
Karl Blau on NPR Live Sessions
 Kelp Lunacy
 MySpace
 KEXP Interview with Karl Blau
 SPIN's Artist of the Day
 Secretly Important Interview with Karl Blau

American male singer-songwriters
Living people
People from Anacortes, Washington
Year of birth missing (living people)
Musical groups established in 1996
Singer-songwriters from Washington (state)
Bella Union artists
The Bundles members